Conway Francis (27 April 1870 – 15 April 1924) was an English cricketer. He was a right-handed batsman and a right-arm fast bowler who played for Gloucestershire. He was born in Clifton and died in Staple Hill.

Francis made a single first-class appearance for the side, during the 1895 season, against Kent. From the upper-middle order, he scored 8 runs in the only innings in which he batted, in which WG Grace scored 257 runs.

External links
Conway Francis at Cricket Archive 

1870 births
1924 deaths
English cricketers
Gloucestershire cricketers
Cricketers from Bristol